Sophie Charlotte of Hesse-Kassel (16 July 1678, Kassel – 30 May 1749, Bützow) was a princess of Hesse-Kassel and by marriage Duchess of Mecklenburg.

Life 
Sophie Charlotte was a daughter of Count Charles of Hesse-Kassel (1654 to 1730) from his marriage to Maria Amalia of Courland (1653 to 1711), daughter of Duke Jacob Kettler of Kurland.

She married on 2 January 1704 in Kassel Duke Frederick William of Mecklenburg-Schwerin (1675–1713).  They had no children.  Frederick William probably suffered from a sexually transmitted disease.

After the death of the Duke in 1713, Sophie Charlotte lived at Bützow Castle.  She was a member of the Reformed, and in the predominantly Lutheran Mecklenburg, she patron of the French Reformed Church.  She founded the German Reformed Church in Bützow.

Sophie Charlotte also visited her brother, Frederick I of Sweden. She was present in Sweden during her brother's visit to Hesse in July–November 1731 to support his spouse Ulrica Eleonora of Sweden, who served as regent in his absence.

References 

 Christian Roeth: history of Hesse, p. 322

External links 
 Froufrou.de
 Reformiert.de
 PDF file, 43 kB

Sophie Charlotte
1678 births
1749 deaths
German duchesses
Daughters of monarchs